China competed at the 2014 Winter Paralympics in Sochi, Russia, held between 7–16 March 2014.

Cross-country skiing 

Men

Relay

Wheelchair curling

Team

Standings

Results

Draw 1
Saturday, 8 March, 9:30

Draw 2
Saturday, 8 March, 15:30

Draw 3
Saturday, 9 March, 9:30

Draw 5
Monday, 10 March, 9:30

Draw 6
Monday, 10 March, 15:30

Draw 8
Tuesday, 11 March, 15:30

Draw 9
Wednesday, 12 March, 9:30

Draw 10
Wednesday, 12 March, 15:30

Draw 12
Thursday, 13 March, 15:30

Playoffs

Semifinal
Saturday, March 15, 9:30

Bronze Medal Game
Saturday, March 15, 15:30

See also
China at the Paralympics
China at the 2014 Winter Olympics

References

Nations at the 2014 Winter Paralympics
2014
Winter Paralympics